The 1952 Major League Baseball All-Star Game was the 19th playing of the midsummer classic between the all-stars of the American League (AL) and National League (NL), the two leagues comprising Major League Baseball. The game was held on July 8, 1952, at Shibe Park in Philadelphia, Pennsylvania the home of the Philadelphia Phillies of the National League. The game resulted in the National League defeating the American League 3–2 in 5 innings. It was the first All-Star Game—and to date, the only—to be called early due to rain.

Mickey Mantle was selected an All-Star for the first time, as was pitcher Satchel Paige, who a day before the game turned 46 years old. Neither appeared in the game.

Synopsis
Jackie Robinson's first-inning home run off American League starting pitcher Vic Raschi to deep left field gave the National League a 1-0 lead.

In the top of the fourth inning, Minnie Miñoso doubled, Al Rosen drew a walk and Eddie Robinson singled in the AL's first run. Next batter Bobby Ávila's infield single made it 2-1.

Before the rain came, the NL struck back with a Hank Sauer homer off Bob Lemon in the bottom of the fourth, with what turned out to be the game-winning runs.

Rosters
Players in italics have since been inducted into the National Baseball Hall of Fame.

American League

National League

Game

Umpires
Al Barlick  (NL)(home), Charlie Berry (AL) (first base), Dusty Boggess (NL)(second base), Bill Summers (AL)(third base), Lon Warneke (NL)(left field), Hank Soar (AL) (right field)

Starting lineups

Linescore

Legacy
The 1952 game had been the first to All-Star Game to be called before the regulation nine innings. Twenty years later, the Phillies presented its Old-Timers Game as a "completion of the 1952 All-Star Game". The Phillies' Simmons had started for the National League, and the Philadelphia Athletcs' Shantz had relived for the American League. On August 19, 1972, prior to the Phillies' regular game with the Houston Astros.

The Old-Timers began in the "sixth inning" with the Veterans Stadium scoreboard showing the National League ahead 3-2 after five innings. Sauer, Bobby Thomson, Country Slaughter, Pee Wee Reese, Gran Hamner, and Robin Roberts all played for the National League Old-Timers. Shantz pitched the first inning of the Old-Timers Game which appeared as the sixth inning on the scoreboard. Shantz yielded five runs, while the American League Old-Timers scored only a run to "complete" the game with a score of 8-3.

External links
Baseball Almanac

References

All-Star Game
1952
1952
Major League Baseball All Star game
July 1952 sports events in the United States
1950s in Philadelphia